Jack Greenhalgh (July 23, 1904 – September 3, 1971) was an American cinematographer, part of the Classical Hollywood cinema generation. He shot Billy the Kid in Santa Fe (1941), Gangster's Den (1945), Too Many Winners (1947) among others. He was active from 1926-53.

Selected filmography
 His Fighting Blood (1935)
 The Lion's Den (1936)
 The Traitor (1936)
 Two Gun Justice (1938)
 The Invisible Killer (1939)
 Hitler – Beast of Berlin (1939)
 Gun Code (1940)
 Secrets of a Model (1940)
 Frontier Crusader (1940)
 The Lone Rider Fights Back (1941)
 Enemy of the Law (1945)
 Outlaws of the Plains (1946)
 Lady at Midnight (1948)
 Savage Drums (1951)
 Rogue River (1951)

References

External links

1904 births
1971 deaths
American cinematographers